John Ross House, also known as Old Matt's Cabin, is a historic home located at the Shepherd of the Hills farm near Branson, Taney County, Missouri.  The original section was built in the mid-1880s or mid-1890s, as a single cell log structure.  It was subsequently enlarged with frame additions through 1910.  It features a stone exterior end chimney.

It was listed on the National Register of Historic Places in 1983.

References

External links
The Shepherd of the Hills website

Houses on the National Register of Historic Places in Missouri
Bungalow architecture in Missouri
Houses completed in 1912
Buildings and structures in Taney County, Missouri
National Register of Historic Places in Taney County, Missouri